Dub Terror Exhaust is an album by American composer Bill Laswell, issued under the moniker Automaton. It was released on August 12, 1994 by Strata.

Track listing

Personnel 
Adapted from the Dub Terror Exhaust liner notes.

Musicians
DJ Spooky – turntables
Sly Dunbar – drums, percussion
Gabriel Katz – bass guitar, effects
Bill Laswell – bass guitar, effects, producer

Technical
Layng Martine – assistant engineer
Robert Musso – engineering, programming

Release history

References

External links 
 
 Dub Terror Exhaust at Bandcamp

1994 albums
Bill Laswell albums
Albums produced by Bill Laswell
Strata (record label) albums